Sharp, Stewart and Company was a steam locomotive manufacturer, initially located in Manchester, England. The company was formed in 1843 upon the demise of Sharp, Roberts & Co.. It  moved to Glasgow, Scotland, in 1888, eventually amalgamating with two other Glaswegian locomotive manufacturers to form the North British Locomotive Company.

Early days
Iron merchant Thomas Sharp and mechanical engineer Richard Roberts first formed a partnership, Sharp, Roberts & Co. (about which, see also company section in article on Roberts), to manufacture textile machinery and machine tools. They opened the Atlas Works in Manchester in 1828.

They had built a few stationary steam engines, and in 1833 built a locomotive, Experiment for the Liverpool and Manchester Railway. It was a four-wheeled 2-2-0 with vertical cylinders over the leading wheels. After a number of modifications, three similar locomotives (Britannia, Manchester, and Hibernia) were built in 1834 for the Dublin and Kingstown Railway. Although they were relatively fast, the vertical cylinders meant they were too hard on the track at speed.

However, in 1834 Charles Beyer also joined the firm and contributed to its success in locomotive building as Roberts soon delegated most of the locomotive design work to him. A new 2-2-2 design was soon produced with horizontal inside cylinders under the smokebox and additional bearings to support the crank axle. Around 600 of these Sharp Single locomotives were built between 1837 and 1857. Ten of the first were sold to the Grand Junction Railway, with the "Sharpies" becoming a standard to compare with the "Bury" engines.

Sharp Brothers and Company
In 1843, Roberts left and the firm became Sharp Brothers and Company. Between 1846 and 1848 the company provided eight 2-2-2 passenger and two 0-4-2 goods locomotives to the Lynn and Dereham Railway. From 1851 to 1853 twenty engines were built for the London and North Western Railway to the design of James Edward McConnell, the so-called "Bloomers", subcontracted from Wolverton.

Sharp, Stewart and Company

In 1852, the senior partner, John Sharp, retired and was replaced by Charles Patrick Stewart, the name of the company changing to Sharp Stewart and Company. Thomas Sharp also retired and was succeeded by Stephen Robinson. In 1860 sole rights were obtained for Giffard's patent injector. The company acquired limited liability in 1864.

The company provided a number of 0-4-0 tender engines for the Furness Railway of which Number 20, built in 1863 has been restored to working order by the Lakeside & Haverthwaite Railway in Cumbria. In 1862, the company began making larger engines, first some 4-6-0 saddle tank engines for the Great Indian Peninsula Railway. By 1865 they were building 0-8-0s, again for India.

Move to Glasgow
Since they were also dealing in general brass and ironmongery, and machine tools, it became necessary to move, which they did in 1888. They took over and moved to the works of the Clyde Locomotive Company in Springburn, Glasgow, renaming it Atlas Works.

A number of compounds were built for the Argentine Central Railway in 1889, some 4-4-0 and some 2-8-0. In 1892 they received an order for seventy five 4-4-0s and 0-6-0s from the Midland Railway. By now they had built a number of 4-6-0 engines for overseas railways, but in 1894 came their first Glasgow order for a British line, the "Jones Goods" of the Highland Railway. By the end of the century they were supplying railways at home and all over the world.

Between 1898 and 1901, Sharp Stewart and Company supplied no less than 16 4-6-0 and 4 4-8-0 locomotives to New Zealand Railways. The 4-8-0 B class locomotives survived till the end of steam either as-built, or as 4-6-4T engines of the We class. The 4-6-0 locomotives were dumped in rivers and on the coast as erosion protection when their time was up. 3 have since been salvaged for preservation.

North British
In 1903, having built over 5000 engines, the company amalgamated with Neilson, Reid and Company and Dübs and Company to form the North British Locomotive Company.

See also
 :Category:Sharp Stewart locomotives

References and sources

References

Sources
 Lowe, J.W., (1989) British Steam Locomotive Builders, Guild Publishing

Locomotive manufacturers of the United Kingdom
Defunct companies based in Manchester
Manufacturing companies based in Glasgow
Manufacturing companies based in Manchester
Vehicle manufacturing companies established in 1852 
Vehicle manufacturing companies disestablished in 1903
British companies established in 1852
British companies disestablished in 1903 
Springburn
1852 establishments in England
1903 disestablishments in Scotland